Sloeštica (Macedonian Слоештица) is a small village in the municipality of Demir Hisar, in the area of Zeleznik, in the vicinity of the town of Demir Hisar. It used to be part of the former municipality of Sopotnica.

The village is known for several distinguished members and a legend for the cavalry of Alexander the Great.

Geography

The village is located in the southwest part of the Municipality of Demir Hisar, on the right side of Crna River. The village is hilly, at an altitude of 770 meters. It is 50 km (northwest) away from the nearest major city, Bitola.

The area around the village occupies an area of 21.4 km², with forests covering an area of 1,511 hectares, with arable land of 330 hectares, and 269 hectares of pastures.

The climate in the settlement is mountainous. It is bordered easterly by the Plakenska Mountain. There are two rivers running through the village: Bela Reka (Golemacha) and Levacha.

History
In the 19th century, Sloeshtica was a Christian village within the Sanjak of Monastir of the sub-district (kaza) of Monastir of the Ottoman Empire.

During the Ilinden Uprising, the village was attacked on August 18, 1903 by Turkish forces. Villagers Bogoya Ivanov, Nikola Talev and Stoycho Ristev were killed from the village, and Mets Stoyanov and Dole Ristev from Slepche died as chetas near the village.

In October 1910 the village suffered during the disarmament action of the young Turks. A Bulgarian teacher in the village, Doychinov was arrested and jailed in the village of Pribilci.

Legend
The village is known for its legend for Alexander the Great. Namely, in the vicinity of the village, there is a rocky hill on which there are impressions from the hoof of the cavalry of Alexander the Great. These traces are seen in the area of Bela Reka, where the soldiers of Alexander cut wood (hazel) for the phalanx spears.

Population

According to Vasil Kanchov in his Macedonia Ethnography and Statistics from 1900, there were 650 inhabitants in the village of Sloeshtica, in 90 houses, all Macedonian Christians. Following this, the secretary of the Bulgarian Exarchate, Dimitar Mishev, recorded in his book La Macédoine et sa Population Chrétienne a population of 720 inhabitants in 1905.

During the second half of the 20th century, a number of the population moved from Sloeshtica, going from a medium to a small village. In 1961 the village had 746 inhabitants, and in 1994, 299 inhabitants.

According to the last census of 2002, 221 inhabitants lived in the village, all Macedonians.

Research on historical families
According to the research of Branislav Rusic in 1952, the genealogy of the village includes the following family names:
Family names with an unknown origin or name: Domazetovci (2 k.), Kaychovci (7 k.), Korunovci (2 k.), Kuzevci (2 k.), Dzhaykovci (4 k.), Jankulovci (5 k.), Bogevci (2 k.), Sivevci and Plevnesovci (21 k.), Despotovci (2 k.), Petkovci (5 k.), Petrevci (5 k.), Gjorgovtsi Mitrevci (8 k.), Meglenovci (8 k.), Kaparkovci (13 k.), Gyurkovci (2 k.), Bojanovci (1 k.) And Nochevci (6 k.)
Family names with a known age: Popovci (11 k.) settled from the village Babino; Ilijevci (1 k.) settled from the village of Cerovo; Poljankovci (1 k.) settled from the village of Suvo Selo; Trajanovci (7 k.) settled from the village of Galičnik in Mijaks region; Svrgovci (4 k.) settled from the village of Bazernik; Evenovci (2 k.) settled from the village of Sladuevo; Trenchevci (2 k.) settled from the village of Jankovec. Finally there is Alekso (living at the age of 45 in 1952), Tale-Stojko-Trenche.

Social facilities
There is a single primary school, known as Braka Miladinovci, named after the Miladinov brothers. It teaches up to the 5th grade. Grades 6 onward go to the school also known as Braka Miladinovci which is located in the nearby village of Žvan.

Municipalities
The village is part of the expanded Municipality of Demir Hisar, to which the former Municipality of Sopotnica was added after the new territorial division of Macedonia in 2004. In the period from 1996-2004, the village belonged to the former Municipality of Sopotnica.

In the period from 1955 to 1996, the village was located within the large municipality of Demir Hisar.

In the period 1952-1955, the village was located in the then Municipality of Zvan, which included the villages of Virovo, Zvan, Mrenoga, Radovo, Sopotnica, Suvo Grlo and Cerovo.

Cultural and natural landmarks

Archaeological sites:
The turn - settlement from Late Antiquity.

Churches:
Church "St. Mother of God " - the main village church (post Byzantian)
Church "St. Atanasij " - the cemetery village church (post Byzantian)
Church "St. Gorgi " - a monastery church
Church "St. Ilija "
Church "St. Nikola " - monastery church of the Toplice monastery

Valavici (artificial waterfall)
Near the village there are waterfalls, artificially built and used in washing and cleaning clothing and blankets.

Cultural events

In the village there is an art gallery known as  "Art Point - Gumno", a non-profit organization located in the village. Their activities are focused on the arts, culture, environmentalism, and the local economic development of the Demir hisar region.

Every year on August 28, there is the "Celebration of the Pirejot", held in memory of the writer Petre M. Andreevski.

Notable individuals
 Vlado Popovski - (1955 - 2014), a politician
 Elijah Dimovski, leader of the detachment from Sloeštica during the Ilinden-Preobrazhenie uprising in 1903
 Petre M. Andreevski - poet, novelist, narrator and playwright
 Jordan Plevnes - writer
 Ljube Cvetanovski - poet, journalist and travel writer
 Vlado Cvetanovski - director
 Sergei Andreevski - painter
 Ljupco Risto Siveski - (1961-1981), a poet
 Stoyan Acev - Macedonian-Adrianople Corps

References

External links
 Images of the village
 Reportings
 Cultural tourism article

Villages in Demir Hisar Municipality